"I Do Believe (Tha Remix)" is a single by New Zealand hip-hop artist Tha Feelstyle, released in 2006.  The single is the title song for the movie Sione's Wedding.

The Remix features other New Zealand rappers, DJs and artists including Mareko, Flowz, Manuel Bundy & Lapi Mariner

Track listings
I Do Believe (Tha Remix) (Radio Edit)
Suga ea!
I Do Believe (Tha Remix) (Instrumental)

2006 singles
Tha Feelstyle songs
2006 songs
Song articles with missing songwriters